Sedlistoye is a rural locality (a selo) and the administrative center of Sedlistinsky Selsoviet in Ikryaninsky District, Astrakhan Oblast, Russia. The population was 956 as of 2010. There are 13 streets.

Geography 
Sedlistoye is located 39 km south of Ikryanoye (the district's administrative centre) by road. Zhitnoye is the nearest rural locality.

References 

Rural localities in Ikryaninsky District